Tunghai University (THU) is the oldest private university in Taiwan, established in 1955. It was founded by the United Board for Christian Higher Education in Asia (UBCHEA). It is located in Xitun District, Taichung, Taiwan. According to Times Higher Educations Impact Rankings 2020, the university is rated as the most impactful private university in Taiwan and third in the country.

The first president, Beauson Tseng, said "Pioneering will be our watchword", hoping that Tunghai would become an outstanding and innovative university. Tunghai became the first university in Taiwan to introduce universal AI education, AWS-powered innovation school and the first in Central Taiwan to establish a Chinese Language Center. The university is known for its liberal arts education, and universal artificial intelligence curriculum.

On the grounds, the Luce Memorial Chapel (designed by architects Chen Chi-kwan and I. M. Pei) is a local landmark. The logo of the university contains a cross in reference to the statement in the founding documents that it was "founded in the love of Jesus," and the three linked circles refer to the Holy Trinity as well as the motto, "Truth, Faith, Deeds". The university shares its name with Tokai University in Japan. The two universities have since entered a partnership agreement.

International cooperation 
Since Tunghai's establishment in 1955, the university has built a global network with more than 289 sister schools in 31 countries across the world, including the US, Australia, Japan, Korea, India, Germany, England, France, Italy, Spain and more. With its profound international connections and affiliations, Tunghai University had launched global programs such as Mini-Semester, Global Elite Program, Global Master of Business Administration (GMBA) and Taiwan's first English-Immersion International College, attracting students and faculties overseas to Taiwan.

Christian affiliations

Council for Christian Colleges & Universities (CCCU) 

Tunghai is a member of the Council for Christian Colleges and Universities, an organization of more than 180 Christian higher education institutions worldwide. CCCU's mission is to promote higher education with a focus on Christian faith, and to assist member schools with academic research and provide scholarships. As a member of CCCU, Tunghai University works to facilitate academic and cultural exchanges with its affiliated schools across the globe.

International Council of Higher Education (ICHE) 
The International Council on Higher Education (ICHE) was founded in Switzerland in 1977 by a group of Christian scholars, with the goal of working together to solve the challenges and facing global higher education. At the same time, ICHE also hopes to promote international linkages and cooperation among member schools.

In 2019, the Asia Annual Conference of International Council for Higher Education was held in Tunghai University. The theme of the conference was "Justice through Higher Education", with participating scholars from the United States, Taiwan, the Philippines, Korea, Nepal, North Korea, and Kyrgyzstan and more.

Association of Christian Universities and Colleges in Asia (ACUCA) 

Association of Christian Universities and Colleges in Asia (ACUCA) is an alliance of Christian universities and colleges in Asia. It is dedicated to the service of Christian faith in higher education, which has been an important platform for mutual support and exchange among Christian educational institutions in the Asia Pacific region. Member schools hold exchange programs with other member schools and can apply for ACUCA scholarships.

The United Board 

Founded in 1922, the United Board for Christian Higher Education in Asia (now the United Board) has established 13 Christian universities in mainland China, including Fukien Christian University, Ginling College, Hangchow University, Huachung University, Hwa Nan College, Lingnan University, Nanking University, St. John's University, University of Shanghai, Shantung Christian University, Soochow University, West China Union University, and Yenching University, making great contributions to China's higher education. Tunghai was founded later in 1953, after the 13 Christian universities were forced to close in mainland China.

International affiliations

Fulbright Taiwan - THU Mini Semester 
The Fulbright Program encourages understanding and mutual trust among people by rewarding talented and passionate students, scholars, artists and experts from diverse backgrounds and fields. Fulbright has been operating for 70 years, bringing a more positive outlook to the world through cross-cultural learning experiences. In 2020, Tunghai's Mini-Semester program was launched in cooperation with the Consortium for Study Abroad in Taiwan (CSAT) managed by Fulbright Taiwan.

Alliance of Asian Liberal Arts Universities (AALAU) 
Alliance of Asian Liberal Arts Universities (AALAU) is composed of 15 liberal arts institutions in Asia, including Tunghai University in Taiwan, Peking University in mainland China, Seoul National University in Korea, and Waseda University in Japan. Tunghai University serves as a founding institution. The purpose of the AALAU is to enable member universities with similar characteristics and visions to learn from and work together to improve the quality of education. AALAU also helps to promote liberal arts education in Asia.

Princeton in Asia (PIA) 
Under Princeton University, Princeton in Asia is an organization with the purpose of bridging East and West educational connections. PIA introduces outstanding teachers to Tunghai University for educational exchange. Since 1955, Tunghai University has been a partner of Princeton in Asia to build an international network in Asia.

International College 

In 2014, the university established Taiwan's first English-taught International College, offering three bachelor's degree programs: international business administration (IBA), sustainability science and engineering (SSE), and an interdisciplinary program.

The college has partner schools including Temple University, Trinity University, Andrews University, University of South Florida, University of Rhode Island, ESC Rennes School of Business, Nottingham Trent University, University of the West of England, University of New South Wales, Southern Cross University of Australia, and more. In 2019, IC graduates were accepted to masters programs including in the University of Pennsylvania, Boston University, University of Manchester, University of Melbourne, University of New South Wales, National University of Singapore and more.

Interdisciplinary degree program 
In 2020, the International College began accepting international students who would like to learn Chinese without declaring a major in the first two years. In their junior and senior year, students can declare a major in either programs within the International College or other colleges at Tunghai University.

Fulbright Taiwan - THU Mini Semester 
Tunghai University's Mini-Semester is a short term visit program of faculties and students from US partner schools to offer and take courses in the International College. Apart from academics, the program also invites international faculties and students on trips to popular tourist attractions in Central Taiwan.

College of Management

Global elite program 
In 2019, Tunghai University’s Management college started a full English global elite program. The program provides students with the opportunity to study abroad with its dual degree programs. Partner schools include Rutgers University, University of Rhode Island, University of Texas at Dallas and more.

Global Master of Business Administration (GMBA) 
Under the College of Management, the Global Master of Business Administration is a full-English taught MBA program available to domestic and international students. GMBA aims to provide students with business courses taught in a global learning environment.

THU also collaborates with Universiti Tunku Abdul Rahman to offer Dual Awards Master of Business Administration (MBA).

College of Arts

International graduate program for teaching Chinese as a second language 
The international graduate program of teaching Chinese as a second language primarily targets non-Chinese native speaking students to acquire a master's degree in Chinese teaching.

College of Science

Graduate program for biomedical and materials science 
Established in 2020, the English-taught program began recruiting international students to receive their doctoral degree in Biomedical and Materials Science.

History 
Tunghai University was founded on the Dadu Plateau, west of Taichung City, in 1955 by Methodist missionaries. The sitting US Vice President, Richard Nixon, had spoken at the ground-breaking ceremony in 1953. The school was named "Tunghai" ("east sea") based on its position east of the Taiwan Strait. In 1950, the United Board for Christian Higher Education in Asia (UBCHEA) established the university in Taiwan in order to pass the torch on the thirteen church universities in mainland China.

Timeline 
1952 February William P. Fenn, Secretary General of the UBCHEA, travelled to Taiwan to discuss with educational and religious leaders on the conditions for establishing the university. Fenn recommended that the university should not be a replica of any church university in mainland China. He suggested the faculty and students should all be Christians, work full-time and live on campus.

1953 Tunghai University was established in DaDu Mountain, Xitun District, Taichung City. On November 11, former U.S. Vice President Richard Nixon presided over the groundbreaking ceremony of Tunghai University. He delivered a speech to symbolize the educational cooperation and enhance military and economic exchanges between Taiwan and the U.S. After that, Ieoh Ming Pe, Chen Chi -Kwan, and Chang Chao-kang were invited to design and build the campus. 
1955 The first class of new students was admitted, with Beauson Tseng as the first president. In the beginning, there were only two colleges, the College of Arts and the College of Science, with 200 students. Under the College of Arts, there were the Departments of History, Departments of Chinese Literature, and Departments of Foreign Language and Literature. The founding ceremony was held on November 2, which became the university's anniversary.

1958 The College of Engineering was established.
1963 The Luce Chapel was completed.
1972 The enrollment was expanded, and an night school was established.
1973 Tunghai Experimental Farm was established.
1976 The College of Business (now the College of Management) was established.
1980 The College of Agriculture and the College of Law (now the College of Social Sciences) were established.

2005 Construction of the second campus began.
2007 the College of Fine Arts and Creative Design was established.  All departments of the College of Management were relocated to the second campus.
2008 Taiwan's first liberal arts education learning community, Poya College, officially began accepting students.
2009 The College of Law was established.2010- The student dormitories on the second campus were completed. The Dairy Shop, supermarket, and Women's Club were renovated.
2013 The Exchange of Future Events ranked Tunghai University as the best private university in Taiwan, the fifth-best private university in terms of social contribution, and the fourth-best private university in terms of internationalization.
2014 The international business administration program was established in the International College.
2017 Master program of performing and creative arts, MPCA, was launched. The Cultural Heritage Department of Taichung City made the Luce Chapel and Priest Bell Tower city monuments.
2018 Joined Amazon.com AWS to create the first Cloud Innovation School in Taiwan.
2019 AI Center was established. The Ministry of Culture announced the upgrading of the Luce Chapel to a national monument.

Liberal arts education 
Since its founding in 1955, Tunghai University has continued to cultivate liberal arts education and founded the nation's first liberal arts college. Because of this liberal arts program, Tunghai has produced as many as 11 academicians of the National Academy, the highest honor for academic scholars in Taiwan.

POYA School 
Taiwan's first liberal arts learning community, the POYA school, is an icon and unique feature of the university. It emphasizes the exposure to a wide range of knowledge and practice.

First Chinese Center in Central Taiwan 

In 1970, Tunghai University established Central Taiwan's first Chinese Language Center. Its education has been nationally recognized with faculties receiving education awards and students winning national speech contests.

Foreign university summer program 
The Chinese Language Center offers a three-to-eight week summer program for language learning and culture exploration. The program partners with universities overseas including University of Massachusetts Amherst, Puget Sound University, Japan's St. Andrew's University, Okinawa University, Okinawa International University, Waseda University, Hokusei Gakuen University, and Konan University.

Cultural experience travel group 
The CLC provides a short term (for those who are visiting for three weeks) cultural experience travel group for international students.

Innovation

Artificial Intelligence (AI) Center 

In order to nurture future AI talents, Tunghai University has been improved computer facilities, and has made AI thinking and programming language courses compulsory for the whole university.

AWS Cloud Innovation School 
With AWS, the School of Cloud Innovation at Tunghai University is Taiwan's first cross-disciplinary collaboration between the College of Engineering, the College of Management and departments of Information Technology, Engineering, Electrical Engineering, Business Administration, and Capital Management. The curriculum covers two major areas: cloud technology and digital economy.

Ranking

Ecological and social responsibility 
Tunghai University is ranked in third place among all the universities in Taiwan, and first among private universities, in Times Higher Education University Impact Rankings, 2020, which assesses universities against the United Nations’ 17 Sustainable Development Goals (SDGs).

In the 2020 Taiwan Corporate Sustainability Award (TCSA), Tunghai University scored high in the categories of Sustainability Model University.

Tunghai also won USR's Best Sustainability Project Awards. Tunghai University and National Taiwan University both won Golden class honors.

Colleges 
Tunghai has nine colleges (College of Science, College of Arts, College of Management, College of Social Sciences, College of Engineering, College of Agriculture, College of Law, College of Fine Arts and Creative Design, and International College), 34 departments and 35 master's programs (one independent master's program and 13 in-service master's programs) and 14 PhD programs.

Campus life and traditions 
Tunghai University is known for its campus and landmarks, and the Daily View ranked it as the most beautiful campus in Taiwan, based on comments on social media.

The Luce Memorial Chapel 
The Luce Chapel is a Christian chapel at Tunghai University in Taichung, Taiwan. Henry R. Luce, the founder of Time Magazine and Life Magazine, funded its construction to commemorate his father, Henry W. Luce. It is the work of Taiwanese architect Chen Chi-Kwan and Chinese-American architect I. M. Pei. It is a landmark of Tunghai University and Taichung City. On April 25, 2019, it was declared a national monument by the Ministry of Culture.

Priest Bell Tower 
Built in 1966, the Priest Bell Tower is located in front of the entrance of the Luce Memorial Chapel in Tunghai University. In 2017, the Taichung City Cultural Assets Office registered it as a municipal monument. The Bell Tower is named in honor of Elsie Priest, who was invited to Taiwan by the United Board for Christian Higher Education in Asia (UBCHEA) in early 1955 to assist Tunghai University as the chief accounting officer and general secretary. Priest made many contributions to the university in its early years.

Tunghai Experimental Farm 
The farm is the largest farm for education and student internships in the country. Covering , there are about 200 dairy cows on the farm, which produces Tunghai's dairy products, including milk and ice cream.

Wenli Boulevard (Arts and Science Boulevard) 
With the red bricks and gray tiles of colleges on both sides and the dense shade of the trees, Wenli Boulevard serves as the main line of movement between the colleges.

Christmas Eve at Tunghai 
Every year, thousands of visitors visit Tunghai University on Christmas Eve for concerts, Christmas markets, activities held by different departments, and most popularly, the 100 rings of the Priest Bell Tower. In 2019, there were a variety of musical and creative activities, including the Midnight Worship Service, choir singing outdoor, Christmas music festival, musical clubs' performances, and the joint Christmas party of four departments. In 2020, The "Road of True Light" installation was set up at Tunghai Bell Tower on Wenli Boulevard, with the theme of "The First Christmas Night", meaning the night of Jesus Christ's birth.

Library
The Tunghai University Main Library is located at the end of the Campus Mall. Library holdings include, approximately, 600,000 volumes, 6,515 current serials, 21,523 electronic serials, nonprint formats, and rare books.

List of presidents 
, 1953–1958
Wu Teh Yao, 1958–1972
, 1972–1978
, 1978–1992
, 1992–1995
, 1995–2004
, 2004–2012
, 2013–2015
, 2016–present

Notable alumni
 Giddens Ko, Blogger, Author and Film Director
 Chen Long-bin, sculptor
 Chiu Ching-chun, Magistrate of Hsinchu County (2009–2018)
 Chung Ling, writer, critic, educator and translator
 Pei-yuan Chia (1961), retired Citicorp executive
 Ho Min-hao, member of Legislative Yuan (2002–2008)
 Ho Ping, film director
 Huang Teng-hui, artist and entrepreneur
 Kolas Yotaka, spokesperson of Executive Yuan
 Che-Ming Ko, nuclear physicist
 Liau Huei-fang, Deputy Minister of Labor (2016-2017)
 Ping-hui Liao (1976), professor of Taiwan studies
 TC Lin (1988 exchange student), filmmaker, photographer, and writer
 Pan Shih-wei, Minister of Labor (2014)
 Tien Hung-mao, Minister of Foreign Affairs (2000–2002)
 Tsai Chi-chang, Vice President of Legislative Yuan
 Kevin Tsai (1985), television host on Kangxi Lai Le
 Tu Weiming (1961), ethicist and New Confucian, Harvard-Yenching Professor Emeritus of Chinese History and Philosophy, Harvard University 
 Ben Wang, professor of materials engineering
 Yang Mu, poet
 Kris Yao (1975), architect
 Yu Shyi-kun (1985), Democratic Progressive Party politician
 Yang Yao, member of Legislative Yuan

See also
Education in the Republic of China

References

External links

Tunghai University 
Tunghai University Library 
Association Of Christian Universities and Colleges in Asia, ACUCA
United Board for Christian Higher Education in Asia

 
Association of Christian Universities and Colleges in Asia
1955 establishments in Taiwan
Educational institutions established in 1955
Universities and colleges in Taiwan
Comprehensive universities in Taiwan